A "Black Lives Matter" street mural has been painted in Santa Cruz, California.

History
Community organizers Abi Mustapha, Sean McGowen, Taylor Reinhold and Shandara Gill spearheaded the mural project. The painting was done by 500 volunteers, and funding was acquired through fundraising, t-shirt sales, and donations. After two months, the project received unanimous approval from the Santa Cruz City Council, making Santa Cruz the first city in America to approve a Black Lives Matter Mural.

The mural was painted September 2020. A fresh coast of paint was applied in June 2021.

The mural was vandalized in July 2021. The vandalism consisted of heavy black tire tread marks resulting from burnouts.

See also

 2020 in art

References

2020 establishments in California
2020 paintings
2020s murals
Black Lives Matter art
Murals in California
Santa Cruz, California
Vandalized works of art in California